Daytrader was an American pop punk band from Brooklyn, New York.

History
Daytrader began in 2010 with the self-release of a demo. In 2011, Daytrader released their first EP titled Last Days of Rome on Run For Cover Records. In 2012, Daytrader released a split with the band The Jealous Sound. Also in 2012, Daytrader released their first and only full-length album on Rise Records titled Twelve Years.

Discography
Studio albums
Twelve Years (2012, Rise Records)
EPs
Last Days of Rome (2011, Run For Cover Records)
Splits
Daytrader/The Jealous Sound 7"
Demos
Demo (2010, self-released)

References

Musical groups from Brooklyn
Musical groups established in 2010
2010 establishments in New York City